Abner Dubic (born 1944) is a Haitian painter. Born in Léogâne, Dubic has exhibited his works in the United States and France. His works are sold in galleries in New York City, Chicago, and Paris.

References
 

1944 births
Haitian painters
Haitian male painters
Living people